Ofelia Echagüe Vera (1904–1987) was a painter and educator from Asunción, Paraguay.
She is credited as a founder of modern art in Paraguay, through her work in the plastic arts, and through her influence upon her students, particularly Olga Blinder, Pedro Di Lascio, and Aldo Del Pino, who became the vanguard of the new movement.
The work of Ofelia Echagüe Vera marked the beginning of a new period that changed the role of women in Paraguayan plastic arts.

Early life 
Ofelia Echagüe began studying in her home city of Asunción with Héctor Da Ponte, Modesto Delgado Rodas, Pablo Alborno, and Adán Kunos. She was awarded a scholarship to Montevideo, Uruguay, where she defined her vocation carrying out studies under the direction of Professor Domingo Bazzurro (1939-1941). In the 1950s, Echagüe further collaborated with Livio Abramo, a Brazilian artist from Paraguay, and together they developed the technique of woodcut prints, an intricate and complicated art form.

Career path 
Paraguayan Art critic Ticio Escobar wrote of Ofelia Echagüe:  

The work of Ofelia Echagüe, in the vision of Escobar, retains an “insistence of the formal aspects,” which don’t diminish what is expressed. Ticio Escobar also notes, “however her robust personality is structured in careful compositions and meditations that denounce the influence of  post impressionism in the River Plate Region, and an unquestionable amount of significant related works to the existential problem of the man; Always at the bottom of loneliness and depression in half-empty environments invaded by cruel light, a feeling of isolation between his women of tough bodies and missing faces.”

Ofelia Echagüe participated in an important collective exhibition of Paraguayan plastic artists, which marked a turning point for a new period that changes the role of women in the Paraguayan plastic arts. From this perspective through her work, Ofelia Echagüe changes into an authentic precursor because it breaks the schematics of the excessively modest puritanism in that Paraguayan art period.

Last years and death 
When she returned to her country, Ofelia Echagüe was dedicated to teaching, specifically at Ateneo Paraguayo first, and the Escuela de Bellas Artes after. She died in Asunción in 1987.

Notes

References 

1904 births
1987 deaths
20th-century Paraguayan artists
Paraguayan artists
Paraguayan women artists